Mahonia polyodonta is a shrub in the Berberidaceae described as a species in 1901. It is native to Assam, Myanmar, and southwestern China (Guizhou, Hubei, Sichuan, Tibet, Yunnan).

References

polyodonta
Flora of Asia
Plants described in 1901